"Bounty" is a song recorded by Canadian country music artist Dean Brody. It was released in August 2013 as the first single from his fourth studio album, Crop Circles. The song features guest vocals from Lindi Ortega.

Critical reception
Shenieka Russell-Metcalf of Top Country wrote that "the catchy –western style song and music video captivate you with a great story and perfect vocals from both artists."

Music video
The music video was directed by Margaret Malandruccolo and premiered in September 2013.

Chart performance
"Bounty" debuted at number 95 on the Canadian Hot 100 for the week of September 21, 2013, and later peaked at number 46. It became a Number One hit on the Billboard Canada Country chart for the week dated December 7, 2013.

Certifications

References

2013 songs
2013 singles
Dean Brody songs
Open Road Recordings singles
Songs written by Dean Brody
Music videos directed by Margaret Malandruccolo